The Ipswich River Wildlife Sanctuary, which is one of the Massachusetts Audubon Society’s largest wildlife sanctuaries, is located in Topsfield and Wenham, Massachusetts. Much of its  landscape was created by a glacier 15,000 years ago.

Features 
The Rockery Trail runs beside large rocks, exotic trees, and shrubs that belonged to an arboretum at Bradstreet Farm, parts of which were donated by owner Thomas Emerson Proctor. The Ipswich River runs for  through the sanctuary, and Mass Audubon makes canoes available for members to rent.

The Sanctuary also offers summer camps and various nature programs for children and adults. There are donated benches scattered throughout the Sanctuary, one perched high on the South Esker Trail with wonderful views of birds on the water below. This bench was donated by Kathy Field and Alan Levites, both now deceased. The bench features an inscribed quote on the back: “It’s the end of all strain, It’s the joy in your heart,” attributed to Antonio Carlos Jobim. Nearby, one can feed chickadees, white breasted nuthatches and other birds by hand.

History 

Thomas Emerson Proctor (1873–1949), a leather fortune heir, lived in the house of Captain Dudley Bradstreet (1765–1833) (currently the Audubon Visitor Center). He owned large pieces of land in Topsfield and other estates in the area.

Sources disagree about whether the sanctuary was bequeathed to the Massachusetts Audubon Society in Proctor's will or purchased by Mass Audubon using funds bequeathed by Annie Brown.  The sanctuary was originally named the "Proctor Wildlife Sanctuary and Annie H. Brown Reservation".

References

External links 
 Ipswich River Wildlife Sanctuary - Mass Audubon

Protected areas of Essex County, Massachusetts
Wildlife refuges in Massachusetts
Nature centers in Massachusetts
Massachusetts Audubon Society